The Sanremo Music Festival 1957 was the seventh annual Sanremo Music Festival, held at the Sanremo Casino in Sanremo, province of Imperia between 7 and 9 February 1957. The show was presented by television presenter Nunzio Filogamo, assisted by Marisa Allasio, Fiorella Mari, Nicoletta Orsomando.
 
According to the rules of this edition every song was performed in a double performance by a couple of singers or groups, with some artists performing multiple songs. This edition included four nights, containing two semi-finals, a final and "Free Authors Competition" night.

The winner of the Festival was "Corde della mia chitarra", performed by Claudio Villa and Nunzio Gallo. The winner of the competition also went to the international Eurovision Song Contest, with Gallo chosen from the two interpreters, to represent Italy. Initially the songs accepted for the festival were 20 then dropped to 19, as one song was disqualified for being published earlier.

Participants and results 

Each of the four nights included overall twenty performances, ten songs with two performances for each, except for the second night which presented nine songs and overall eighteen performances. The song "La cosa più bella" performed by Carla Boni and Tonina Torrielli was excluded from the second evening for its earlier publication in a juke box in Milan as a version engraved by Cristina Jorio. Five songs advanced from each semi-final to again compose ten songs for the third and final night.

The fourth night, called "Free Authors Competition" (Italian: "Concorso liberi autori"), included ten different songs with their own ranking and scoring, focused on their writing qualities.

Eurovision Song Contest
The winner of this edition, of the third night final, represented Italy at the international Eurovision Song Contest. From the two Sanremo Music Festival interpreters for "Corde della mia chitarra", Nunzio Gallo was chosen to perform the song at Eurovision. Out of ten songs from ten competing countries at the Eurovision Song Contest 1957, the Italian song achieved seventh place, receiving points from five out of the nine other countries.

References 

Sanremo Music Festival by year
1957 in Italian music
1957 in Italian television
1957 music festivals